"Test for Echo" is the title track and first single from Canadian rock band Rush's 16th studio album released in 1996. The song's lyrics were written by Neil Peart and Pye Dubois with music written by Geddy Lee and Alex Lifeson. The song reached No. 1 on the Billboard Hot Mainstream Rock Tracks chart. It was the band's fourth consecutive album to yield a chart-topper on this chart, along with "Show Don't Tell" from Presto, "Dreamline" from Roll the Bones, and "Stick It Out" from Counterparts. The song also peaked at #6 on the Canadian Singles Chart, which is the band's highest position on that chart since New World Man peaked at #1 in 1982.

Track listing

"Test for Echo" - 5:55
"Test for Echo" (Edit) - 5:01

Charts

Weekly charts

Year-end charts

See also
List of Rush songs
List of number-one mainstream rock hits (United States)

References

1996 singles
1996 songs
Rush (band) songs
Songs written by Alex Lifeson
Songs written by Geddy Lee
Songs written by Neil Peart
Songs with lyrics by Pye Dubois
Song recordings produced by Peter Collins (record producer)